Ain Zana (Aïn-Zana) is a town and commune in Souk Ahras Province in north-eastern Algeria.
It is the site of Diana Veteranorum, a former ancient city and bishopric in Numidia. It is now the Latin Catholic titular see, Diana.

History 
Diana was important enough in the Roman province of Numidia to become one of the many suffragan bishoprics no later than mid third century AD, yet was to fade.

Titular see 
The diocese was nominally restored in 1933 as a Latin titular bishopric.

It has had the following incumbents, all of the lowest (episcopal) rank :
 Thomaz Franciszek Czapski, Cistercians (O. Cist.) (1726.07.01 – 1730.12.06)
 Hugh MacDonald (1731.02.12 – 1773.03.12)
 Andreas Stanislaus von Hattynski (1800.08.11 – 1837.10.02)
 Daniel Latussek (1838.02.12 – 1857.08.17)
 Félix Biet (畢天榮), Paris Foreign Missions Society (M.E.P.) (1878.07.23 – 1901.09.09)
 Charles-Eugène Parent (1944.03.11 – 1951.03.02) as Auxiliary Bishop of Rimouski (1944.03.11 – 1951.03.02), succeeded as Metropolitan Archbishop of Rimouski (Canada) (1951.03.02 – 1967.02.25), emeritate as Titular Archbishop of Vassinassa (1967.02.25 – 1970.11.26)
 Gérard Mongeau, Missionary Oblates of Mary Immaculate (O.M.I.) (1951.03.27 – 1976.06.12) as Bishop-Prelate of the Territorial Prelature of Cotabato (1951.03.27 – 1976.06.12), promoted first suffragan Bishop of Cotabato (Philippines) (1976.06.12 – 1979.11.05), promoted first Metropolitan Archbishop of Cotabato (1979.11.05 – 1980.03.14)
 Jacques Louis Léon Delaporte (1976.06.22 – 1980.03.25) as Auxiliary Bishop of Nancy (France) (1976.06.22 – 1980.03.25); later Metropolitan Archbishop of Cambrai (France) (1980.03.25 – 1999.11.21)
 Raymond Saint-Gelais (1980.07.05 – 1988.02.19)
 Marcel Germain Perrier (1988.04.15 – 2000.05.16)
 Alfonso Milián Sorribas (2000.11.09 – 2004.11.11)
 Pierre-André Fournier (2005.02.11 – 2008.07.03) as Auxiliary Bishop of Québec (Canada) (2005.02.11 – 2008.07.03); later Metropolitan Archbishop of Rimouski (Canada) (2008.07.03 – 2015.01.10)
 Thomas Löhr (2009.06.15 – ...), Auxiliary Bishop of Limburg (Germany)

References

Sources and external links
 GCatholic with titular incumbent biography links

Diana
Diana
Communes of Souk Ahras Province